The Central Committee of the 7th Conference of the Russian Social Democratic Labour Party (Bolsheviks) was in session from 29 April 1917 until 3 August 1917.

Meetings
The CC was not a permanent institution. It convened plenary sessions, of which one CC meeting was held between the 6th Conference and the 6th Congress. When the CC was not in session, decision-making powers were transferred to inner bodies of the CC itself; the Politburo, Secretariat and Orgburo (none of these bodies were permanent either, but convened several times a months).

Composition

Members

Candidates

References

Citations

Bibliography
 

Politburo of the Central Committee of the Communist Party of the Soviet Union members
Secretariat of the Central Committee of the Communist Party of the Soviet Union members
Central Committee of the Communist Party of the Soviet Union
1917 establishments in Russia
1917 disestablishments in Russia